The Company She Keeps is a 1951 drama film starring Lizabeth Scott, Jane Greer and Dennis O'Keefe.

The film was directed by John Cromwell, whose film the previous year, Caged, also concerned a woman sent to prison.

It marked Jeff Bridges' film debut.

Plot
Released from prison after serving two years on a check-forging charge, Mildred Lynch changes her name to Diane Stuart and moves to Los Angeles.

Parole officer Joan Willburn finds her a job at a hospital. Diane repays her by stealing Joan's boyfriend, Larry Collins, after he comes to the hospital to visit a patient.

Diane hides the relationship from Joan and hides her past from Larry. Once she finally finds out, Joan graciously accepts the new relationship but warns Diane that to get married, she must first seek approval from the parole board, which will be under a legal obligation to contact Larry.

Despite all the help Joan has been, Diane accuses her of trying to sabotage her romance and also her parole, after Diane is arrested for a drug theft at the hospital for which ex-convict Tilly Thompson is responsible. She runs away until Larry lets her know that, thanks to Joan, the charges have been dismissed.

Cast
 Lizabeth Scott as Joan
 Jane Greer as Diane
 Dennis O'Keefe as Larry
 Fay Baker as Tilly
 John Hoyt as Judge Kendall 
 Irene Tedrow as Mrs. Seeley

Reception
The film recorded a loss of $315,000.

References

External links
 
 
 
 
 

1951 films
Films scored by Leigh Harline
Films directed by John Cromwell
1951 drama films
American drama films
American black-and-white films
1950s English-language films
1950s American films